The 11th annual Genie Awards were presented March 20, 1990, and honoured Canadian films released the previous year. For the first time ever the awards were broadcast by CTV, rather than CBC. Despite an extensive advertising campaign the ratings plummeted, with only half as many people watching compared to the previous year. In total, an average of only 460,000 watched the awards.

The ceremony was broadcast from the Metro Toronto Convention Centre in Toronto. The ceremony had no overall host, although actor Al Waxman introduced and concluded the ceremony and broadcaster Brian Linehan hosted segments filmed on location at various films in production. The Best Picture nominees were each given a full two-minute clip during the broadcast.

The awards themselves were dominated by Denys Arcand's Jesus of Montreal.

Awards

References

External links 
Genie Awards 1990 on imdb 

11
Genie
Genie